Jeanne-Mance was a former provincial electoral district in Quebec, Canada.

It corresponded to part of the Saint-Léonard neighbourhood in Montreal.

It was created for the 1966 election from parts of Montréal–Jeanne-Mance electoral district.  Its final election was in 1998. It disappeared in the 2003 election, as nearly all of its territory and a part of Viger electoral district were merged to become the Jeanne-Mance–Viger electoral district.

It was named in honour of French settler Jeanne Mance.

Members of the Legislative Assembly / National Assembly

References

External links 
Election results
 Election results (National Assembly)
 Election results (QuebecPolitique.com)
Maps
 1992–2001 changes (Flash)

Former provincial electoral districts of Quebec